Second Chances is an American drama television series created and written by producers Bernard Lechowick and Lynn Marie Latham. The two-hour pilot episode was directed by Sharron Miller. Its cast includes Connie Sellecca, Matt Salinger, Megan Porter Follows, Jennifer Lopez, and Michelle Phillips. The series premiered December 2, 1993, on CBS, and aired its final episode on February 19, 1994. Hotel Malibu, which was touted as a spinoff of this series, debuted in August 1994.

This series marked a reunion between actors Ronny Cox and Frances Lee McCain who had worked together two decades before on another CBS series called Apple's Way.

Cast

 Connie Sellecca as Dianne Benedict
 Matt Salinger as Mike Chulack
 Ronny Cox as George Cook
 Megan Porter Follows as Kate Benedict
 Justin Lazard as Kevin Cook
 Jennifer Lopez as Melinda Lopez
 Francis Lee McCain as Felicity Cook
 Michelle Phillips as Joanna Russel
 Pepe Serna as Salvador Lopez
 Ray Wise as Judge Jim Stinson
 Ramy Zada as Det. Jerry Kuntz

Episodes

Production
On January 17, 1994, the Northridge earthquake damaged the show's sets, and CBS decided to cancel the series instead of investing money to repair them – in addition to the cost of rebuilding, both Connie Sellecca and Megan Follows were pregnant and would have been far along by the time the sets were rebuilt.  The series' last episode ran on February 10, 1994, as part of CBS's "Crimetime After Primetime" lineup.  Part of the cast and characters were moved to the summertime replacement show Hotel Malibu in August 1994, which was touted as a spinoff of the series.

Reception
Ken Tucker of Entertainment Weekly rated the pilot episode a C− saying that it "relies on too many verbal cliches and pat coincidences to promise much in the way of engrossing escapism". Tony Scott of Variety stated that the series "needs more riveting material" as the pilot episode "suffers from blatant, uninvolving characters, low-caliber plotting and subcommercial appeal".

References

External links

1990s American drama television series
1993 American television series debuts
1994 American television series endings
CBS original programming
Television series by Warner Bros. Television Studios
Television shows set in Los Angeles